The Green Party of Minnesota is a green political party in the U.S. state of Minnesota. It is affiliated with the Green Party of the United States.

History
The Minnesota Greens Confederation, founded  1990–91, fostered the development of local Green Party organizations in the state. The Green Party of Minnesota was organized in December 1993. It was officially established in February and June 1994 at two founding conventions.

Twin Cities Greens was organized in 1988. The Green Party of St. Paul was established in 1997 to 1998.

The Green Party of Minnesota was founded in 1994 on the Four Pillars of the Green Party: Ecological Wisdom, Social and Economic Justice, Grassroots Democracy, and Nonviolence and Peace.

In the 2000 Presidential Election, Green Party presidential nominee Ralph Nader and vice presidential nominee Winona LaDuke received 5% of the vote in Minnesota, which earned major party status for the Green Party in Minnesota. But in the election of 2004, neither Green Party presidential nominee David Cobb nor any candidate for statewide office received 5% or more, thus losing major party status in the state.

In 2003 Elaine Fleming became the first elected Green mayor in Minnesota. Fleming is mayor of Cass Lake, Minnesota, and was elected mayor for her first term by seven votes. Fleming was elected mayor for a second term as a write-in candidate. As of 2006, Fleming was serving her second and last term as Mayor.

While the party is currently defined as a minor political party, it has had recent success in some city elections, especially in Minneapolis and St. Paul. In 2005, Cam Gordon, a former chair of the Green Party of Minnesota, was elected in Ward 2 to the Minneapolis City Council, winning over DFLer Cara Letofsky in a 51% to 48% vote. Ward 2 is considered one of the most diverse areas of Minneapolis, representing the University of Minnesota Minneapolis Campus and the Cedar-Riverside and Seward neighborhoods. Despite this gain on the council, two Green incumbents on the council, Natalie Johnson Lee (Ward 6) and Dean Zimmermann (Ward 7), were unseated during the 2005 election. Redistricting had pitted both against other council incumbents.

While initially elected as a Democrat in 1986 to the Minneapolis Park Board, Annie Young ran as a Green from her third term on, becoming one of the longest serving Park Board Commissioners in Minneapolis history.

In 2009 Cam Gordon was re-elected to Minneapolis City Council. In 2011 Green Party endorsed Laura Libby was elected to the Section 1 seat of the City Council of Crystal, Minnesota. Cam Gordon was elected to a third term on the Minneapolis City Council in 2013.

In 2014 the Green Party of Minnesota ran former DFL State Representative Andy Dawkins for Attorney General receiving 1.49% of the vote statewide and regaining minor party status.

Despite restrictive Minnesota ballot access laws, volunteers collected three times the required signatures to place Green endorsed presidential candidate Dr Jill Stein on the ballot in 2016. Minnesota Secretary of State Steve Simon refused to replace the ballot petitions stand-in Vice Presidential candidate Howie Hawkins with Ajamu Baraka, the only candidate of color in the race, despite no law denying his ability to do so. Dr Jill Stein went on to receive 1.26% of the vote statewide – double the Green Presidential vote from 2012 – and again securing minor party status for the Green Party of Minnesota until 2020.

Three additional Greens were elected in 2016, including the first elected Green in Ramsey County history – Lena Buggs winning a seat on the Ramsey County Soil & Water District Board unseating the incumbent. In Anoka County, Greens Sharon Lemay and Steve Laitinen were both elected to the Anoka County Soil and Water District Board as well.

Current elected officials
City councils
Cam Gordon, Minneapolis City Council, Ward 2 (2006-2022)
Bryce Lange, Lewiston City Council, At-Large

Boards and commissions

Ideology 
The Green Party of Minnesota follows the ideals of green politics, which are based on the Four Pillars of the Green Party: Ecological wisdom, Social justice, Grassroots democracy and Nonviolence.  The "Ten Key Values," which expand upon the four pillars, are as follows:
 Grassroots democracy
 Social justice
 Ecological wisdom
 Nonviolence
 Decentralization
 Community-based economics
 Women's rights
 Respect for diversity
 Global responsibility
 Future focus

The Green Party of Minnesota constitution Article XI Section 2 prohibits donations from corporations or political action committees (PACs). The party's platforms and rhetoric harshly criticize any corporate influence and control over government, media, and society at large.

Leadership
The party is led by a 17-member coordinating committee which sets the party's long-range goals, budget, and strategy. These decisions are then implemented by an executive committee made of five party co-chairs, each of whom is responsible for one of five portfolios of party business (membership, political affairs, finances, communications, and internal organization). Each portfolio co-chair oversees a number of committees and party functions. While the coordinating and executive committees handle day-to-day operations of the state party, most organizing, activism, and decision-making is decentralized into a number of autonomous local party organizations (or "seedlings") located throughout the state.

GPMN Coordination Committee 

Trahern Crews – Chair
Darnella Wade
Carol Mellom
Joshua Scheunemann
John Matheson
Gary Blatz

See also
 Politics of Minnesota
 List of political parties in Minnesota

References

Further reading

External links

1994 establishments in Minnesota
Political parties in Minnesota
Minnesota
State and local socialist parties in the United States